The Bregu Mosque is one of the six mosques in Ulcinj, Montenegro, and it is located in neighbourhood Meraja. It was built by captain Ahmet Gjyli from Ulcinj in 1783, near his own house. It was significantly damaged in the earthquake in 1979 and in 1986 was reconstructed. The Friday Khutbah is given in Arabic and Albanian.

See also 
 Ulcinj
 List of mosques in Ulcinj

References

Mosques in Ulcinj